A Man of the People (1966) is a novel by Nigerian writer Chinua Achebe. Written as a satirical piece, A Man of the People follows a story told by Odili, a young and educated narrator, on his conflict with Chief Nanga, his former teacher who enters a career in politics in an unnamed fictional 20th century African country. Odili represents the changing younger generation; Nanga represents the traditional West African customs, inspired by that of Achebe's native Nigeria. The book ends with a military coup, similar to the real-life coup organized by Major Chukwuma Kaduna Nzeogwu, Major Adewale Ademoyega, Major Emmanuel Ifeajuna, Captain Chris Anuforo, Major Donatus Okafor, and Major Humphrey Chukwuka.

Plot introduction 
A Man of the People is a first-person account of Odili, a school teacher in a fictional country closely resembling post-colonial Nigeria. Odili receives an invitation from his former teacher, Chief Nanga, who is now the powerful but corrupt Minister of Culture. As Minister, Nanga's job is to protect the traditions of his country especially when he is known as "A Man of the People". Instead, his position is used to increase his personal wealth and power that proves particularly alluring to Odili's girlfriend; she cheats on him with the minister. Seeking revenge, Odili begins to pursue the minister's fiancee.

Odili agrees to lead an opposition party in the face of both bribes and violent threats. Then there is a military coup.

Similarity to future events 
Upon reading an advance copy of the novel, Achebe's friend, Nigerian poet and playwright John Pepper Clark declared: "Chinua, I know you are a prophet. Everything in this book has happened except a military coup!"

Later on, Nigerian Major Chukwuma Kaduna Nzeogwu seized control of the northern region of the country as part of a larger coup attempt. Commanders in other areas failed, and the plot was answered by a military crackdown which resulted in the presidency of Major General Johnson Aguiyi-Ironsi.

Literary significance 
Some of the themes from the novel are found in a short story "The Voter" (1965), published in Black Orpheus magazine. Achebe's first three novels were all clearly set in Igbo villages in Nigeria. A Man of the People, however, was set in a fictional African country as Achebe sought to write African literature on the condition of the continent in more general terms. The novel does not include any specific ethnic or cultural groups. The problems portrayed in the book, such as bribery, incompetence and governmental apathy, were experienced by many West African nations in the neocolonial era. As Nigeria had not experienced a coup when Achebe wrote A Man of the People, his model for the novel's events must have been military coups in other African nations. Despite his intentions, however, the subsequent coup in Nigeria meant that the book was again seen as being principally about Nigeria.

The novel was republished in the influential Heinemann African Writers Series.

References 

Novels by Chinua Achebe
1966 Nigerian novels
Novels set in Nigeria
Nigerian English-language novels
Heinemann (publisher) books
African Writers Series